Nadja may refer to:

 Nadja (given name)
 Nadja, pen-name of Louisa Nadia Green (1896—1934), British poet
 Nadja (novel), 1928 surrealist novel by André Breton
 Nadja (film), 1994 vampire film by Michael Almereyda
 Nadja (band), Canadian drone doom metal side project of Aidan Baker

See also
 Nadia (disambiguation)